Dragon Hill may refer to:
Dragon Hill, la colina del dragón, a 2002 Spanish film
Dragon Hill, Uffington, a small hillock in the English county of Oxfordshire
Dragon Hill Lodge